The Superior Propane Centre is a multi-purpose arena in Moncton, New Brunswick which opened on November 8, 2003, with four NHL-sized ice surfaces, one of which (the Champions Arena) has seating for 1,500 spectators.  It was home to the Moncton Beavers of the Maritime Junior A Hockey League until 2007 when they moved to Dieppe and became the Dieppe Commandos. It is the home of the Moncton Mariposa Figure Skating Club, the Moncton Minor Hockey Association the Moncton Ringette Association and Lacrosse Moncton. The facility also contains a pro shop, full-service restaurant, coffee shop and meeting facilities.

The Red Ball Internet Centre is part of the CN Sportplex, which also consists of 10 ballfields, six soccer fields and an indoor air supported multipurpose sports dome (The Dundee Sports Dome).

Former Names
 Red Ball Internet Centre 
 Tim Hortons 4 Ice Centre

See also
 Moncton Sport Facilities

References

External links 
 Former Red Ball Internet Centre Official Website
Superior Propane Centre Official Website

Indoor ice hockey venues in Canada
Sports venues in Moncton
Indoor lacrosse venues in Canada